The 8 December 2020 incident French: Affaire du 8 décembre 2020 refers to the arrests of nine French citizens who had joined the Kurdish People's Defense Units (YPG) by French authorities in December 2020. Having volunteered to fight with the Kurdish forces against the Islamic State and having returned to France in 2018, they were designated as far-left extremists by the General Directorate for Internal Security and were arrested in a series of raids on 8 December 2020. Seven of the nine were then criminally charged with associations with terrorism. After a few months of detention, however, all except one were released.

Background 
Several dozen French citizens have travelled to Syria since 2015 to join Rojava in the fight against Islamic extremists Daesh. In September 2019, Mediapart reported that French intelligence had placed a number of those volunteers under surveillance.

Timeline 
On 8 December 2020, at six in the morning, the General Directorate for Internal Security (Direction générale de la Sécurité intérieure, or DGSI) and the RAID conducted raids to arrest nine French citizens who had returned from Rojava, in Syria, in 2018. Those nine had all travelled to Rojava to join the YPG to assist in the fight against Daesh. National Centre for Counter Terrorism head Laurent Nuñez claimed that the arrests demonstrated that there was an increased risk of far-left extremism in France.

After being detained for three days, two of the arrested were subsequently released, whereas the other seven (six men and one woman, all in their early 30s) were charged with criminal association with intent to commit terrorist acts. A police source claimed to newspaper Sud Ouest that the arrested were "trying to purchase weapons, were training, and preparing explosives," and that they had vague undefined plans to target "the police or the military."

After a few months, however, only one, named Libre Flot and considered by the police as the leader of the group, was still under detention. In late February 2022, he began a hunger strike in protest against the poor conditions and the solitary confinement of his detention. In his letter, he stated that it had been "more than 14 months that I’ve been buried alive in a hellish and permanent solitude without having anyone to talk to" and that the director of detentions of the prison he was being held in had told him that his "placement and my maintenance in solitary confinement were decided from the first day by very high ranking people and that whatever I say or [the director of detentions] says or does, nothing will be done about it." After being hospitalised due to the hunger strike, he was conditionally released for health reasons on 7 April. His trial is due to be heard in 2023.

Controversy 
The charges brought against the seven have been controversial, and have been compared to the Tarnac Nine.

Monde diplomatique journalist Philippe Baqué has stated that none of the objects claimed by the police to be material for explosives seized during the arrests were particularly uncommon or unusual to be owned, and that, as of April 2021, the police have yet to release clear evidence of intent to commit terrorist acts. One of the arrested wrote in Lundi Matin that, contrary to police claims, they had not been an organised group and their detentions were the first time some of them had met.

Isabelle Sommier of Paris 1 Panthéon-Sorbonne University stated that arrests seemed politically motivated, "to demonstrate that the state is doing something" against recent demonstrations that had broke out in violence.

References 

December 2020 events in France
Far-left politics in France
People's Protection Units